Women in Georgia live in a society which has been changing over the centuries, where, after decades of Soviet regime, from the 1990s onwards, the culture has seen rapid social changes and new emerging values, but has also been affected by economic instability.

Historical context

  
On May 26, 1918, the National Council of Georgia unilaterally seceded from the crumbling Russian Empire by passing The Act of Independence of Georgia givinng birth to the Democratic Republic of Georgia. According to this act, “the Democratic Republic of Georgia equally guarantees to every citizen within her limits political rights irrespective of nationality, creed, social rank or sex". Accordingly in 1919, Georgian women were able to vote in the elections of the new Constituent Assembly of Georgia. The election saw fifteen women candidates stand for election, five of whom were elected to the 130-person assembly, all on the Social democratic ticket. The five elected assemblywomen were Ana Sologashvili, Elisabeth Nakashidze-Bolkvadze, Kristine Sharashidze, Eleonora Ter-Parsegova-Makhviladze and Minadora Orjonikidze-Toroshelidze.

In 1921 Georgia was annexed by the Red Army and remained a part of the USSR until it's dissolution. In 1991, after the Soviet dissolution, Georgia became an independent country. As with other countries of the former communist bloc, the recovery from a socialist economy to a market economy was hard, and unemployment, economic destabilization, and conflicts have harmed the population, especially in the 1990s. In terms of population, more than 8 out of 10 inhabitants are ethnic Georgians, but there are also minorities such as Azeri, Armenians, Russians, and others. The vast majority of the population is Orthodox Christian, but about one in ten are Muslim. The urbanization of the country is 53.6% (est. 2015). The total fertility rate (TFR) of 1.76 children born/woman (est. 2015) is below the replacement rate. The maternal mortality rate is 36 deaths/100,000 live births (est. 2015).

Constitutional provisions
The Constitution of Georgia states at Article 14 that:

Social role of women 

Because Georgian culture is a patriarchal one, women are accorded a chivalric form of respect. Women can have the role of both as "breadwinner and housewife". Most of the chores at home are done by women. There is no "explicit division of labor" according to gender, except in so-called "areas of physical labor" (an example is in the field of mining). The statue of Mother of Georgia (Kartlis Deda, or "Mother of Kartli") that stands at a monument in the hills above Tbilisi perhaps best symbolizes such national character: in her left hand she holds a bowl of wine with which she greets her friends and in her right is a sword drawn against her enemies. One of the most important and powerful rulers of Georgia was Queen (king of kings) Tamar the Great. In more recent history Georgian women have been able to acquire various positions in the military including being among the few professional fighter and helicopter pilots of the country's small airforce and also a small number in the army's special operations forces. Many women also serve in the field of law enforcement and the government. However, no women are allowed to become priests of the Orthodox church or Muslim mullahs. The so-called "traditional stereotypes of gender-defined social roles" are undergoing changes because of the education being received by new generation of women. Clothing norms stipulate that inside churches, head covering and dress or skirt for women are usually required.

Employment
The Labour Code of Georgia has certain protections for women. Article 2 Labor Relations para. 3 prohibits discrimination based on "race, color, language, ethnic or social origin, nationality, origin, property, birth, place of residence, age, gender, sexual orientation, disability, membership of a religious , social, political or other associations, including the trade unions, by marital status, political or other opinion". Art. 27 grants maternity leave, and Art 36 and Art 37 in general (and explicitly at sections Art 36(2)g together with Art 37(3)c) protect women from dismissal due to  maternity, childbirth and child care, leave for a newborn child adoption and additional leave for child care.
The Law of Georgia on Gender Equality provides additional protections.

Domestic violence and human trafficking
In 2006, Georgia enacted Law of Georgia on Elimination of Domestic Violence, Protection and Support of Victims of Domestic Violence.
Georgia also ratified the Council of Europe Convention on Action against Trafficking in Human Beings in 2007.

References

External links 

 Lomsadze, Giorgi. The Virginity Institute: Sex and the Georgian Woman, EURASIANET.org

 
Georgia